Beau Greaves (born 9 January 2004) is an English darts player who currently plays in the World Darts Federation (WDF) and Professional Darts Corporation (PDC) events. She is the current World Darts Federation women's world champion, having won the 2022 WDF World Darts Championship. She is also a WDF Europe Cup Champion.

Career

Early career
Greaves started playing regularly in tournaments and league games at the age of 10, having been introduced to darts by her brother Taylor. She made her stage debut at the girls' 2014 Winmau World Masters and lost in the final to Robyn Byrne. Two years later, she won a gold medal in the 2016 WDF Europe Cup Youth singles competition against Christina Schuler by 4–1 in legs and also takes gold and silver medal in others competition. In the same year, she advanced for a second time to the final of the girls' 2016 Winmau World Masters and lost to Veronika Koroleva.

Not only did Greaves win numerous national girls' titles, but she also became a regular contender in the women's tournaments, reaching the final of the Jersey Classic at the age of 13. In 2017, she advanced for third time to the final of the girls' 2017 Winmau World Masters and successfully took the title after defeating Katie Sheldon in a whitewash.

Greaves successfully defended her title at the girls' 2018 Winmau World Masters by beating Hayley Crowley in the final, also without giving up a leg. In 2018, she won the all-girls competition of the 2018 WDF Europe Cup Youth, defeating Emine Dursan in the singles competition.

2019
In April 2019, she threw a 9-dart finish at a tournament in her hometown of Doncaster. In May 2019, Greaves won both the Welsh Open and the Welsh Classic in the women's category. Later in June, she won both women's singles titles, the girls' title and the overall youth title at the England National Singles and the England Open. Only the women's doubles title was narrowly denied to her that weekend, but she was the youngest player ever to win the British Pentathlon. At the end of the month she also won the BDO Gold Cup, followed by another title at the West Midlands Open at the end of August.

At the beginning of September 2019, Greaves won the England Matchplay. At the 2019 WDF World Cup in Romania, she won the girls' singles and doubles with Shannon Reeves, and she was also successful at the premiere of the Northern Cyprus Open. At the age of 15, Greaves then qualified for the 2020 BDO World Darts Championship for the first time as the sixth seed, becoming the youngest women player to play in the World Darts Championship. She beat Tori Kewish in the first round and Aileen de Graaf in the quarter-finals to reach the last four on debut, where she lost to reigning champion Mikuru Suzuki.

2020
By winning the Scottish Open in February 2020, Greaves took first place in the women's British Darts Organisation rankings at the age of 16.

2021
In 2021, Greaves struggled with dartitis during the coronavirus pandemic, but still won the Welsh Classic and a year later both events on the Isle of Man. Greaves then took part in the 2022 WDF World Darts Championship at Lakeside, where she defeated Veronika Ihász by 2–1 in sets in the first game and then defeated Aileen de Graaf by 2–0 in sets. A 3–0 win over Lorraine Winstanley made Greaves the youngest ever women's World Championship finalist, and the following day she was crowned World Champion with a 4–0 win over Kirsty Hutchinson.

2022: PDC World Darts Championship debut
In 2022, Greaves won the Welsh Open for the second time in May and the 2022 Dutch Open in June. She was also able to win the individual event of the Six Nations Cup, she also won the Romanian Open and England Open and the platinum title at the 2022 Australian Darts Open also belonged to her. In August 2022, Greaves made her debut at the 2022 PDC Women's Series and won four consecutive finals, becoming the first player to do so. She subsequently won four more consecutive finals to end the year with a record eight straight Women's Series titles.

At the end of September 2022, Greaves was selected by the national federation to participate in the 2022 WDF Europe Cup held in Spain. On the second day of the tournament, she advanced to the finals of the singles competition, defeating the favorites Anca Zijlstra, Robyn Byrne, and Rhian O'Sullivan en route to the final. In the final, she beat Almudena Fajardo 7–4 in legs.

In December 2022, Greaves made her debut at the PDC World Darts Championship, losing to William O'Connor 0–3 in the first round.

World Championship results

BDO/WDF
 2020: Semi-finals (lost to Mikuru Suzuki 1–2)
 2022:  Winner (beat Kirsty Hutchinson 4–0)
 2023:

PDC
 2023: First round (lost to William O'Connor 0–3)

Performance timeline

Career finals

WDF major/platinum finals: (5 titles, 1 runner-up)

References

Living people
English darts players
2004 births
Professional Darts Corporation women's players
WDF world darts champions